The Ukrainian orthography of 1933 is the Ukrainian orthography, adopted in 1933 in the capital of the UkrSSR, Kharkiv. It began the process of artificial convergence of Ukrainian and Russian language traditions of orthography. Some norms that were rejected due to their absence in the Russian orthography were returned to the Ukrainian orthography of 2019.

On the eve of the reform 
In the 1920s, Ukrainian linguistics flourished, and considerable work was done to standardize the Ukrainian literary language, scientific terminology, and dictionaries. The work of scientists was marked by the publication of the Ukrainian orthography in 1928, which for the first time became official and unified for the whole of Ukraine. The Academic Russian-Ukrainian Dictionary, ed. Ahatanhel Krymskyi. However, the codification of 1928–1929, which combined the Dnieper and Transdniestrian language norms in one orthographic code, proved unsatisfactory under those political circumstances and required changes.

The beginning of repression and Russification 
In the early 1930s, a wave of total planned Russification swept over Ukraine under the slogans of the struggle against Ukrainian nationalism.

The "new era" of Soviet policy in relation to Ukrainian culture, as well as language, began after the resolution of the Central Committee of the CPSU (b) on April 3, 1932, "On the Suppression of Nationalism in Ukraine" and the introduction of communist ideas throughout. To do this, Pavel Postyshev was sent to Ukraine, and he arrived in the capital, Kharkiv, in January 1933. He forcibly cleansed Ukraine of "nationalists." On July 7, 1933, Mykola Skrypnyk committed suicide without enduring torture. Members of the Presidium of the Orthography Commission Vsevolod Hantsov, A. Prykhodko, S. Pylypenko were repressed (Oleksa Syniavsky and A. Krymskyi were later repressed). The orthography looked for the "nationalist wreckage" needed to fight the Ukrainian national revival.

Eradication of specific features of the Ukrainian language 
To destroy and stop the flourishing of the Ukrainian language in general, and the literary language in particular, the Bolsheviks first undertook with other people's hands - this was undertaken by Andrii Khvylia (real name Olinter) and N. Kaganovych. In fact, they were the first to make a fuss, as if in Ukrainian linguistics it was a bourgeois-chauvinistic destructive method, which A. Khvylia consolidated in his sad memory with the book "Eradicate, Destroy the Roots of Ukrainian Nationalism on the Linguistic Front", Kharkiv, 1933, printed 15,000 copies.

A. Khvylia, chairman of the newly created 1933 Orthography Commission at the People's Commissariat of Education, stated:

Without any discussions or conferences, the said Commission "revised" and in 1933 issued new rules. The letter ґ was dropped from the alphabet, the spelling of foreign words was radically changed, and paradigms of declension tokens were changed. About 126 amendments have been made to the rules, the section on orthography of foreign words has been completely changed. The new orthography rules were first published in the journal "Polytechnic Education" (933, No. 6), at the end of 1933 they were published in a separate book "Ukrainian orthography".

With accusations of drive a wedge between Russian and Ukrainian language practices:

 Removed dual forms (дві книзі, три вербі, чотири хаті, дві руці та ін.).
 The use of the possessive case in the forms: бачу молодиці, веду хлопці, дивлюся на піонерки.
 From parallel forms бабів and баб, хатів and хат, губів and губ, статтів and статей only those closest to the Russian version are left.
 From parallel word-forming variants становисько — становище, огнисько — огнище, гноїсько — гноїще preference is given to the formation with an extension (suffix) -ище.
 Parallel forms of the dative and local singular cases of nouns of the second declension святові — святу, серцеві — серцю, сонцеві — сонцю, у русі — у рухові limited to forms on -у (ю), common with Russian forms.
 Alternation of prefixes (prepositions) з — с before deaf consonants к, п, т, х was distributed on ф:

 The inscription of the foreign words бакханка, барбаризм on the Latin model is returned to the East Ukrainian variants developed under the influence of the Russian languages: вакханка, варваризм, as well as претенсія, іхтіосавр, бронтосавр, (legalized претензія, іхтіозавр, бронтозавр), радіюс, консиліюм, медіюм, Маріюпіль  (legalized радіус, консиліум, медіум, Маріуполь).
 The use of the endings of the dative singular of the masculine singular (-ові, -еві/-єві) is simplified. According to the previous orthography, masculine nouns should have the endings -ові, -еві/-єві, and the use of the ending -у/-ю is limited. Further reforms simplified and generalized the use of these forms, preferring a similar Russian ending -у/-ю.
 There is a solid spelling of a number of adjectives:

 The ending -и in the genitive singular for feminine nouns with two consonants at the end of the base was replaced by -і:

 Consistent with the etymology of writing alternating vowels:

 In indirect cases, Ukrainian surnames received new endings:

 Geographical names are Russified. According to the 1928 orthography, the names of cities had to be transmitted "in writing in their folk-historical form" (§ 81), and the Orthography of 1933 required to be transmitted "as accepted by the Soviet authorities" (§ 89):

The names of the cities began to end in -ськ, -цьк (not -ське, -цьке): Волочинське, Старобільське, Пинське, Зінов'ївське, Луцьке, etc.

Such names as nouns began to be distinguished: із Старобільська, під Волочинськом, and not as adjectives: із Старобільського, під Волочинським.

Adjectives formed from the names of cities перемиський, радомиський, inverted on перемишльський, радомишльський.

 It is practiced to avoid nouns in cases when they do not repeat the Russian use: preposition до in pairs with до школи, до Києва successively replaced by a preposition у — у школу, у Київ.
 Constructions with impersonal adjectives have disappeared from use in the UkrSSR: випуск машин припинено, злочинця затримано; натомість процвітає суржикування: випуск машин припинений, злочинець затриманий.
 Artificially divided adjective дружній of two adjectives: дружний and дружній, the difference between them can be established only by putting them with Russian counterparts дружный and дружественный. The same operation is done with the word багатир. Two words are artificially made from one word: багатир (rich) and богатир (vytiaz, knight, hero).
 Introduction of new terminology copied from Russian in all fields of knowledge:

 The names of people are standardized in accordance with the Eastern Ukrainian tradition:

 Because the letter ґ was removed from the alphabet, foreign proper names with h and g began to be given with only one letter г, regardless of pronunciation (§ 76):

 Vocabulary from the Greek language with the letter θ (Cyrillic Fita) was changed according to the Eastern Ukrainian model:

 The sound combination ія in foreign words, approved by the orthography of 1928, has been replaced by the Russian practice іа:

 German diphthong еі, that sounds like Ukrainian ай, got the Russian spelling ей:

 In borrowed words with a soft l, the East Ukrainian pronunciation of a hard l is affirmed:

 The spelling of foreign words according to the Russian pattern is organized:

 Normalized accents:

Russification of terminology and vocabulary 
After the physical massacre of linguists, the terminological case suffered another blow. Special brigades were set up to review dictionaries and remove "nationalist" words and terms; by violent methods all terminology (technical, scientific) is brought into full compliance with the Russian. Even in linguistics, Russian grammatical terminology has been introduced, rejecting all the achievements of Ukrainian scholars.

The "orthographic" reform has actually turned into a struggle with the original and authentic features of the Ukrainian language. To this end, Andriy Khvylia, a fighter against "nationalism" in linguistics, himself later repressed for nationalism, put forward the following demands to the party's supervisory bodies for terminological activities:

 Stop publishing all dictionaries immediately;
 Review dictionaries and all terminology;
 Unify technical terminology with the terminology that exists in the Soviet Union and is used in Ukraine;
 Review the cadres on the language front and expel bourgeois-nationalist elements from this front;
 Review orthography.

Ukrainian vocabulary was made dependent on Russian, there was a systematic elimination of specific Ukrainian vocabulary and its replacement by Russian. For example:

Specific Ukrainian word закотистий (закотистий комір) removed from dictionaries and introduced words відкладний (відкладний комір), because it repeats the Russian form отложной (отложной воротник).

When the compilers of the 1933 Orthography were repressed, in circumstances of fear and language chaos, all periodicals, as well as publishing houses in the UkrSSR, regularly received lists of words to avoid from the leading Communist party publication.

Exactly the same language policy is applied to the Belarusian language. Also in 1933, a new Belarusian spelling was introduced — "Narkamaŭka", about 30 phonetic and morphological features, taken from the Russian language, were introduced into the Belarusian language. Active Russification of Belarusian vocabulary began by directing the lexicographic practice.

Text 
 (Alternate link: .)

See also 

 Ukrainian orthography of 1928
 Russification of Ukraine
 Chronology of Ukrainian language suppression
 Ukrainian orthography of 1960
 Draft Ukrainian orthography of 1999
 Ukrainian orthography of 2019

Notes

References

Sources 

 Караванський С. Секрети української мови. Науково-популярна розвідка з додатком словничків репресованої та занедбаної української лексики. — К. : УКСП «Кобза», 1994. — 152 с. — ISBN 5-87274-051-4.
 Німчук В. Проблеми українського правопису в XX ст.
 Огієнко І. І сторія української літературної мови. — Київ, 2001. — (Перше видання — Вінніпег, 1949).
 Larysa Masenko. Ukrainian Language in the 20th Century: History of Linguocide: documents and materials / Masenko, Larysa. KM-Academy, 2005. Kyiv. ISBN 966-518-314-1.

External links 

 1933 in the history of the Ukrainian language
 Linguistic repressions of 1933

1933 introductions
1933 in Ukraine
History of Ukraine (1918–1991)
Ukrainian orthography
Russification